Wore or WORE may refer to:
 Wore, Benin
 "Write once, run everywhere", a variant of the "Write once, run anywhere" slogan created by Sun Microsystems to illustrate the cross-platform benefits of the Java language

See also
 
 
 Wear (disambiguation)
 Whore (disambiguation)
 Jasmin Wöhr, professional tennis player
 WOR (disambiguation)